Tenellia punicea is a species of sea slug, an aeolid nudibranch, a marine gastropod mollusc in the family Fionidae.

Distribution
This species was described from British Columbia, Canada, Pacific Ocean. It has been suggested that this species is synonymous with the Atlantic Ocean species Tenellia pustulata but this seems unlikely given the differences in colour, diet and anatomy. Only the 16S and H3 gene were sequenced and these are known to be identical in some other species pairs.

Ecology
Tenellia punicea feeds on a large purple athecate hydroid which is thought to be an undescribed species of Corymorpha.

References 

Fionidae
Gastropods described in 1986